Nutwadee Pram-nak (born 9 October 2000) is a Thai footballer who plays as a midfielder for the Thailand women's national team.

Early life
Pram-nak was born in Phitsanulok and raised in Bangkok.

College career
Pram-nak has attended the University of North Carolina at Pembroke in the United States.

International goals
Scores and results list Thailand's goal tally first.

References

2000 births
Living people
Nutwadee Pram-nak
Nutwadee Pram-nak
Nutwadee Pram-nak
Women's association football midfielders
UNC Pembroke Braves athletes
College women's soccer players in the United States
Nutwadee Pram-nak
Nutwadee Pram-nak
Nutwadee Pram-nak
Expatriate women's soccer players in the United States